Groove Games was a Canadian developer and publisher of video game. Established in 2001, Groove Games had published more than 20 retail game titles on the PC, Xbox, and PlayStation 2 platforms.

In December 2006, Groove Media Inc. launched an online software platform, SkillGround. It allowed visitors to download retail-quality games for free and play against competitors of similar skill levels for fun, or for cash. SkillGround hosted multiple genres including: first-person shooter, racing, sports and fighting.

Released games

References

External links
 Groove Media Inc
 Groove Games
 SkillGround
 Groove Games entry at MobyGames

Defunct video game companies of Canada
Video game publishers
Video game companies established in 2001
Video game companies disestablished in 2009
2001 establishments in Ontario
2009 disestablishments in Ontario